Ivankovo railway station is a railway station on Novska–Tovarnik railway. Located in Ivankovo. Railroad continued to Stari Mikanovci in one and the other direction to Vinkovci. Ivankovo railway station consists of 5 railway track.

See also 
 Croatian Railways
 Zagreb–Belgrade railway

References 

Railway stations in Croatia